The Grand Seasons Hotel is a three star hotel built between the years of 1996 and 1998 in Kuala Lumpur, Malaysia. It is the tallest hotel in Malaysia as certified by the Malaysian Book of Records, standing 184 meters (603 ft) above ground.  The hotel is 40 floors tall and has 800 rooms. On 28 February 2019, the hotel ceased operations after more than 20 years in business.

References

Skyscraper hotels in Kuala Lumpur
Hotel buildings completed in 1998
Hotels established in 1998
Defunct hotels in Malaysia
1998 establishments in Malaysia